Arias Soga was a medieval Galician clergyman.

References
 Consello da Cultura Galega (ed.), Documentos da Catedral de Lugo, (Santiago de Compostela, 1998)

Clergy from Galicia (Spain)